Hamish David Sneddon Miller (June 26, 1941 – April 24, 1997) was a South African first-class cricketer who played for Western Province and Free State in South Africa and Glamorgan in English county cricket.

A University of Wales student, Miller's highest score of 81 came against Gloucestershire at Cheltenham in 1964 and his best bowling figures of 7/48 against Nottinghamshire at Trent Bridge, also in 1964. He finished his career in South Africa with Orange Free State.

In 1997 he died on a flight from Albuquerque to Salt Lake City in the United States of America.

1941 births
1997 deaths
South African cricketers
Glamorgan cricketers
Western Province cricketers
Free State cricketers
International Cavaliers cricketers